Cavemen is an American sitcom that aired on ABC from October 2 to November 13, 2007. The show was developed by Joe Lawson, Josh Gordon and Will Speck, based on the GEICO Cavemen TV commercials, which were also written by Lawson. It was described by the network as a "unique buddy comedy that offers a clever twist on stereotypes and turns race relations on its head", and is set in San Diego, California. However, the show earned an extremely negative reception, becoming regarded as one of the worst television shows of all time.

Plot
In the series, cavemen were never really fully supplanted by modern humans, but integrated into Homo sapiens civilization as a separate species sub-group.  Cavemen are a small but widespread minority group that have been present in every global civilization since the dawn of recorded history (a montage scene in the opening credits shows Cavemen in Egyptian hieroglyphs, when George Washington crossed the Delaware River, standing with Abraham Lincoln, participating in the space program, etc.).  Effectively, Cavemen form another ethnic minority in the modern world, which faces several prejudices from Homo sapiens (sometimes referring to humans by the derogatory term "Smoothies" in reference to their relative lack of hair, or "Sapes" in reference to their species). Although these cavemen self-identify as  Cro-Magnon, their facial appearance and physical anatomy is reminiscent of the Neanderthal.

Some Cavemen attempt to pass as Homo sapiens by shaving off their body hair - other Cavemen call them "Shavers".
The central humor of the show is that Caveman characters are not brutish primitives, but fully integrated into white-collar jobs; the central Cavemen characters are effete modern city-dwellers.  They must also endure racial epithets such as "Magger", a pun based on "Cro-Magnon".

The series focuses on three Cavemen roommates who share a condo: Joel, his brother Andy, and their cynical and self-absorbed roommate Nick.

According to producer Joe Lawson, the show was originally going to be set in Newport News, Virginia, due to its proximity to the water. The setting then changed to Atlanta, Georgia and finally San Diego, California.

Cast

Main
 Bill English as Joel Claybrook
 Nick Kroll as Nick Hedge
 Sam Huntington as Andy Claybrook
 Kaitlin Doubleday as Kate McKinney
 Jeff Daniel Phillips as Maurice
 Stephanie Lemelin as Thorne
 Julie White as Leslie McKinney

Recurring
 John Heard as Tripp McKinney
 Evan Shafran as Nathan
 J. P. Manoux as Glen
 Kim Director as Heather
 Stephanie Courtney as Diane

Production history

Conception 
In March 2007, ABC gave a pilot order to a script written by Joe Lawson which was inspired by the GEICO Cavemen advertisements. Lawson would be executive producer alongside Guymon Casady, Daniel Rappaport, Will Speck and Josh Gordon. Gordon and Speck also developed the series with Lawson and directed the pilot. Later in the same month, Bill Martin and Mike Schiff joined the staff as executive producers. ABC gave the series an early pick-up and a 13-episode order on May 11, 2007.

Casting 
When the pilot was approved by the network in March, it was unclear if the original actors, Jeff Daniel Phillips and Ben Weber, who played the cavemen in the advertisements, were going to be part of the series. This was not to be when it was later reported that Nick Kroll, Kaitlin Doubleday, and Bill English had all landed roles in the series in the same month. Dash Mihok and Stephanie Lemelin were respectively cast in April as Jamie, Joel's younger brother, and Thorne, a party girl. John Heard rounded out the regular cast when he was chosen to play Trip in the same month. Mihok was replaced by Sam Huntington and the character of Jamie was renamed Andy in July. Tony Award winner Julie White was also promoted to a regular cast member as Kate's mother in the same month.

In July 2007 it was announced that Phillips had been cast for the series.  He subsequently appeared in the first broadcast episode playing Maurice, a friend of the three main characters.

Pilot episode controversy
The initial limited screening of the pilot episode was met with a less than favorable reception. The pilot was accused of being racist as some critics thought the Cavemen were being used as a metaphor for African-Americans and other minorities. The series subsequently underwent a major creative "retooling", which included changing the show's venue from Atlanta, Georgia to San Diego, California. The pilot episode has remained unaired on ABC.

Reception
In terms of reception from the media the show was "critically savaged". The Chicago Tribune listed it as one of the 25 worst TV shows ever, and Adam Buckman of the New York Post declared the show "extinct on arrival."  Ginia Bellafante of The New York Times wrote "I laughed.  But I laughed through my pain. 'Cavemen,' set in some version of San Diego where people speak with Southern accents, doesn’t have moments as much as microseconds suspended from any attempt at narrative."

Other critics were more forgiving: Pulitzer Prize-winning columnist Dorothy Rabinowitz said that the show "has its charms... The chief source of that charm is the unmistakable hint of wit in the writing. Only a hint – but it's steady, which is enough to seduce."

In 2010, TV Guide Network listed the show at #22 on their list of 25 Biggest TV Blunders, arguing that basing a TV show on a commercial was a bad idea from the beginning.

Broadcast
Produced by ABC Studios and Management 360, the series originally aired alongside Carpoolers on Tuesday nights at 8:00 pm Eastern/7:00 pm Central. The series was placed on hiatus during the Writers Guild of America strike, and canceled before the strike ended. A total of 13 episodes were produced. The final six episodes never aired in US markets but did however air in Australia.

Post-cancellation
After the show's cancellation, a Geico commercial was aired during Super Bowl XLII in which two cavemen watched television, switched it off, and had an exchange about Cavemen:

(blows a raspberry) "Huh. A TV show. About us." (disbelievingly)
"What was the deal with that makeup?"
"Exactly! Why not just use real cavemen?"
"Well, I thought their diction was good. You could hear everything they were saying. At least they didn't say 'It's so easy a...'"
"Yeah. Yeah. At least there's that."

All 13 episodes were originally supposed to be released on DVD in 2008; however, plans were put on hold.

List of episodes

Weekly ratings
In the following summary, rating is the percentage of all households with televisions that tuned to the show, and "share" is the percentage of all televisions in use at that time that are tuned in. 

Unless otherwise cited, the overnight rating and share information comes from Zap2It  The following week, the Nielsen numbers from TVWeek.com. Additional ratings information, including the 18–49 rating, comes from BroadcastingCable and finally weekly overall ratings come from ABC Medianet

Seasonal ratings
Seasonal ratings based on average total viewers per episode of Cavemen on ABC:

+ Information is current as of January 7, 2008.

Worldwide premieres
2007: United States, Canada, United Kingdom, Australia and New Zealand
2008: France, Germany, Sweden, Mexico, Italy, Greece, India, Japan, Thailand and Dominican Republic

Overseas distribution
Aired on Channel Seven in Australia in 2008.
Aired on Comedy Central in the Netherlands in 2008.

References

External links 
 

2000s American single-camera sitcoms
2007 American television series debuts
2007 American television series endings
Alternate history television series
American Broadcasting Company original programming
English-language television shows
American fantasy television series
Prehistoric people in popular culture
Television series by ABC Studios
GEICO
Television shows set in San Diego
Fiction about neanderthals
Works based on advertisements
Television series about cavemen